Nazar Khan (also Romanized as Naz̧ar Khān; also known as Razvaliny Nezerkhan) is a village in Zangebar Rural District, in the Central District of Poldasht County, West Azerbaijan Province, Iran. At the 2006 census, its population was 139, in 34 families.

References 

Populated places in Poldasht County